The 2021 Súper Liga Americana de Rugby season was the second season of Súper Liga Americana de Rugby, an annual rugby union competition sanctioned by Sudamérica Rugby. The competition began on 16 March and ended on 15 May.

Teams

Team changes
Ceibos did not compete in the 2021 edition of the competition, having been replaced by the Argentine Rugby Union with the Jaguares XV. The Brazilian side are now known as Cobras Brasil XV or Cobras following the end of relationship with the Corinthians multi-sport club. The Colombian Cafeteros Pro also debuted this year. They were meant to debut in the 2020 season before it was cancelled due to the COVID-19 pandemic.

Season format
The six clubs in the competition competed in the regular season, which took place over 10 weeks and consisted of a double round-robin, with each participating club playing two matches against each of the other five clubs. The top 4 clubs at the end of the regular season moved on to the championship playoffs.

The championship was contested between the top four regular season clubs in a knockout tournament.

Venues
Due to the COVID-19 pandemic the 2021 season was held in Chile and Uruguay only. The first half of the regular season was held at Estadio Municipal de La Pintana in Santiago and Estadio Elías Figueroa Brander in Valparaíso. The second half of the regular season and the playoffs of the competition was held at Estadio Charrúa in Montevideo.

Regular season
The regular season began on 16 March and ended on 1 May.

Standings 
<noinclude>

Matches
The following are the match results for the 2021 Super Liga Americana de Rugby regular season:

Updated to match(es) played on 1 May 2021 
Colors: Blue: home team win; Yellow: draw; Red: away team win.

Week 1

Week 2

Week 3

Week 4

Week 5

Week 6

Week 7

Week 8

Week 9

Week 10

Championship Playoffs

Semifinals

Final

Player Statistics

Top scorers

The top try and point scorers during the 2021 Súper Liga Americana de Rugby season are:

Last updated Oct 6, 2021

Awards
MVP of the Tournament

All-SLAR First Team

References

Super Rugby Americas
2021 rugby union tournaments for clubs